Bam Bidya Pith High School is a Government School. The address of the school is VILL/P.O- Bhaga Bazar PIN-788120 Cachar, Assam. It is one of the old schools in this area. It was established in 1956 by Mohi Uddin Ahmed (principal founder). He is survived by 2 sons and a daughter named Ms. Rita Mazarbhuiya. Total 56 batches completed in this school from past 56 years.

High schools and secondary schools in Assam
Educational institutions established in 1956
1956 establishments in Assam